= Iranian Women's Handball League =

- Sport: Handball
- Country: IRAN
- Continent: Asia
- Most recent champion: Larestan (2022–23)

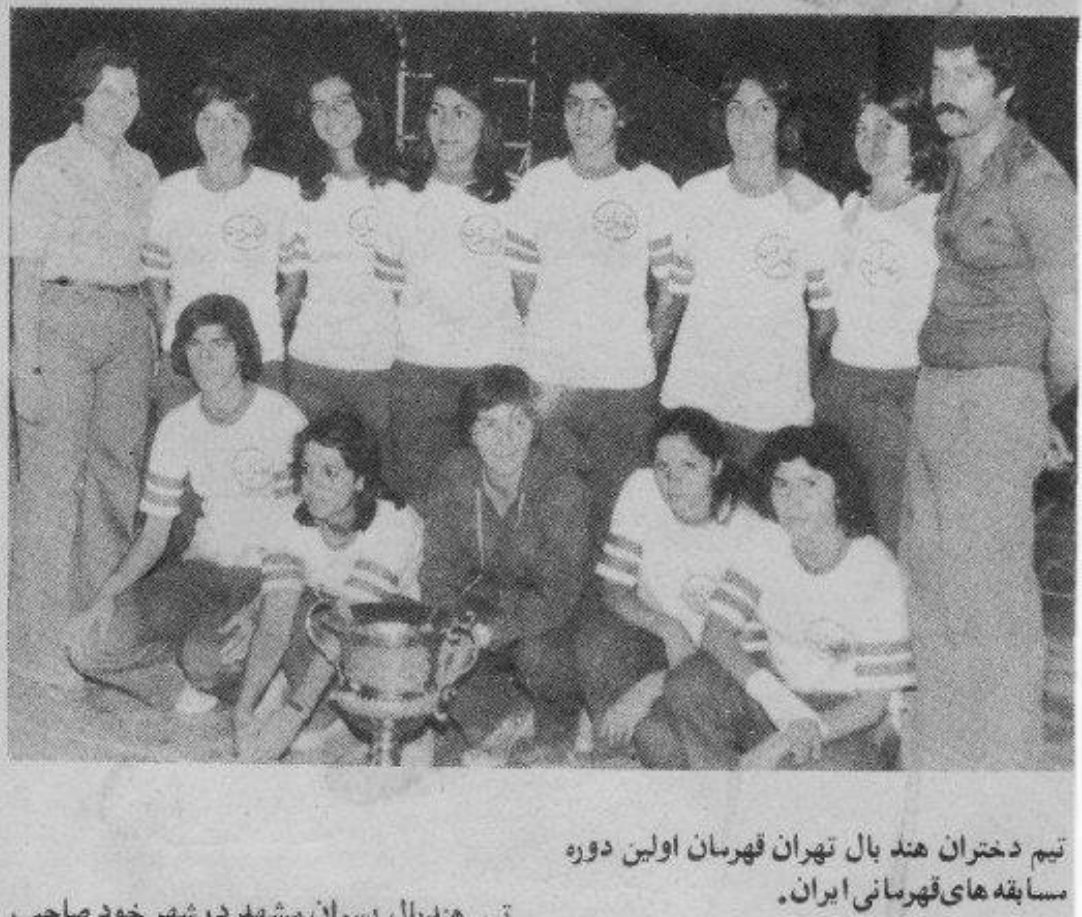
Tehran girls' handball team wins first national tournament in Mashhad, 1976.

Iran Women's (Premier) Handball League is the highest level of national handball competitions in Iran.

Until June 2016, the Larestan team won the women's premier league four times and became runner-up once. Team Samen Sabzevar has become the champion 5 times from 2011 to 2015.

== League champions ==
=== First Division ===
Season	Champion	Runner-up	Third place
1996–97			
1997–98			
1998–99	Tarbiat Badani Fars	Foolad Isfahan	Moghavemat Basij Kerman
1999-00			
2000–01			
2000–01			
2001–02			
2002–03	Zob Ahan Isfahan	Foolad Isfahan	Payam Tehran
2003–04			

=== Premier League ===
The premier league has been the highest level of women's handball league in Iran since 2005.

Season	Champion	Runner-up	Third place
2005–06	Shahrdari Shiraz	Zob Ahan Isfahan	Sepahan Isfahan
2006–07			
2007–08	Sepahan Isfahan		
2008–09	Zob Ahan Isfahan	Handball Fars	Sepahan Isfahan
2009–10	Zob Ahan Isfahan	Handball Fars	Perspolis Tehran
2010–11	Handball Fars	Zob Ahan Isfahan	Sepahan Isfahan
2011–12	Samen Sabzevar	Zeytoon Kerman	Zob Ahan Isfahan
2012–13	Samen Sabzevar	Bime Razi Tehran	Shokohi Kordestan
2013–14	Samen Sabzevar	Shahrdari Sanandaj	Samen Tehran
2014–15	Samen Sabzevar	Shahrdari Sanandaj	Tasisat Daryayi Tehran
2015–16	Samen Sabzevar	Shahrdari Sanandaj	Tasisat Daryayi Tehran
2016–17	Larestan	Tasisat Daryayi Tehran	Zob Ahan Isfahan
2017–18	Tasisat Daryayi Tehran	Nafto Gaz Gachsaran	Larestan
2018–19	Larestan	Tasisat Daryayi Tehran	Zob Ahan Isfahan
2019–20	Eshtehad Saze Mashhad	Nirozamini Kazerun	Tasisat Daryayi Tehran
2020–21	Eshtehad Saze Mashhad	Nirozamini Kazerun	Sepahan Isfahan
2021–22			
2022–23			
